Diadelia albosquamulosa is a species of beetle in the family Cerambycidae. It was described by Breuning in 1949.

References

Taxa named by Stephan von Breuning (entomologist)
Diadelia
Beetles described in 1949